Bom Jesus (meaning Good Jesus in Portuguese) is a neighbourhood (bairro) in the city of Porto Alegre, the state capital of Rio Grande do Sul, in Brazil. It was created by Law 5799 from December 15, 1986, but had its limits modified by Law 6594 from January 31, 1990.

Neighbourhoods in Porto Alegre